FMA Pulqui may refer to:

 FMA I.Ae. 27 Pulqui I
 FMA IAe 33 Pulqui II